The women's tournament in sitting volleyball at the 2020 Summer Paralympics was held from 27 August to 5 September 2021 at the Makuhari Messe, Tokyo.

Results
All times are local (UTC+9).

Preliminary round

Pool A

Pool B

Knockout stage

Bracket

Seventh place match

Fifth place match

Semifinals

Bronze medal match

Gold medal match

Final ranking

See also
 Sitting volleyball at the 2020 Summer Paralympics – Men's tournament

References

Women